The Picot task force was set up by the New Zealand government in July 1987 to review the school system. The mandate was to review management structures and cost-effectiveness, but did not include curriculum, teaching or effectiveness.

The Government largely accepted the recommendations, with legislation giving effect to a new era in education coming into force on 1 October 1989.

Membership
The members of the task force were: Brian Picot, a businessman, Peter Ramsay, an associate professor of education at the University of Waikato, Margaret Rosemergy, a senior lecturer at the Wellington College of Education, Whetumarama Wereta, a social researcher at the Department of Maori Affairs and Colin Wise, another businessman.

The task force was assisted by staff from the Treasury and the State Services Commission (SSC), who may have applied pressure on the task force to move towards eventually privatizing education, as had happened with other government services.
The mandate was to review management structures and cost-effectiveness, but did not include curriculum, teaching or effectiveness.
In nine months the commission received input from over 700 people or organizations.

Administering for Excellence
The Picot task force released its report Administering for Excellence: Effective Administration in Education in May 1988.
The report was critical of the Department of Education, which it labelled as inefficient and unresponsive.
It recommended a system where each school would be largely independent, governed by a board consisting mainly of parents, although subject to review and inspection by specialized government agencies.

The government accepted many of the recommendations in their response Tomorrow's Schools - which became the basis for educational reform in New Zealand starting in 1989.

However, not all recommendations survived. The concept of a coordinating Education Policy Council was dropped.
The Picot task force conceived of the school charter as a contract between school boards, the local community and central authority. After a review by the SSC, the boards of trustees were made responsible to the Minister of Education, who gained the power to dismiss boards. 

The recommendation of the task force to provide funding to the boards for payment of salaries, rather than have teachers paid by the government, was rejected at first. Later reintroduced on a voluntary trial basis, the concept of paying salaries out of block grants was rejected by most boards.

See also
 Education in New Zealand
 History of education in New Zealand
 Tomorrow's Schools

References

Bibliography

Politics of New Zealand
History of education in New Zealand